The eighth season of the American television medical drama Grey's Anatomy, commenced airing on the American Broadcasting Company (ABC) on September 22, 2011, with a special 2-hour episode and ended on May 17, 2012 with the eighth season having a total of 24 episodes. The season was produced by ABC Studios, in association with Shondaland Production Company and The Mark Gordon Company, and overseen by showrunners Shonda Rhimes, Tony Phelan and Joan Rater.

This season follows the storyline of Meredith Grey (Ellen Pompeo) and Derek Shepherd (Patrick Dempsey) as they try to save their marriage and adopt Zola after Meredith tampered with the Alzheimer's trial in the previous season. Miranda Bailey (Chandra Wilson) also struggles to forgive Meredith because Richard Webber (James Pickens, Jr.) takes the blame for Meredith and steps down from his role of Chief of Surgery, and Owen Hunt (Kevin McKidd) takes his place. Cristina Yang (Sandra Oh) decides to have an abortion, putting her relationship with Hunt at odds. Callie Torres (Sara Ramirez) and Arizona Robbins (Jessica Capshaw) co-parent their baby with Mark Sloan (Eric Dane) who continues to have an on/off relationship with Lexie Grey (Chyler Leigh). Alex Karev (Justin Chambers) deals with the fallout of his decision to tell Owen about Meredith altering the Alzheimer's trial, and becomes an outcast by the other residents. Teddy Altman (Kim Raver) marries Henry Burton (Scott Foley), who later dies of a heart condition, leaving her devastated.

The season hit the series' low for ratings as it ended with an average of 10.92 million viewers ranking at #34 and in the 18-49 key demographic ranked at #12. Loretta Devine garnered critical acclaim for her portrayal of Adele Webber and earned numerous nominations including the Primetime Emmy Awards for Outstanding Guest Actress in a Drama Series and the Critics' Choice Television Awards. James Pickens, Jr. won Outstanding Supporting Actor at the NAACP Image Awards, and Chandra Wilson and Sandra Oh both received nominations for Outstanding Actress in a Drama. Stacy McKee was nominated for Humanitas Prize for writing "White Wedding". Sara Ramirez was nominated at the 13th ALMA Awards for Favorite TV Supporting Actress. For the 38th People's Choice Awards, the show was nominated for Favorite TV Drama, and Ellen Pompeo and Patrick Dempsey were respectively nominated for Favorite TV Drama Actress and Favorite TV Drama Actor.

Episodes 

The number in the "No. in series" column refers to the episode's number within the overall series, whereas the number in the "No. in season" column refers to the episode's number within this particular season. "U.S. viewers in millions" refers to the number of Americans in millions who watched the episodes live. Each episode of this season is named after a song.

Cast and characters

Main 
 Ellen Pompeo as Dr. Meredith Grey
 Sandra Oh as Dr. Cristina Yang
 Justin Chambers as Dr. Alex Karev
 Chandra Wilson as Dr. Miranda Bailey
 James Pickens, Jr. as Dr. Richard Webber
 Sara Ramirez as Dr. Callie Torres
 Eric Dane as Dr. Mark Sloan
 Chyler Leigh as Dr. Lexie Grey
 Kevin McKidd as Dr. Owen Hunt
 Jessica Capshaw as Dr. Arizona Robbins
 Kim Raver as Dr. Teddy Altman
 Sarah Drew as Dr. April Kepner
 Jesse Williams as Dr. Jackson Avery
 Patrick Dempsey as Dr. Derek Shepherd

Recurring 
 Jason George as Dr. Ben Warren
 Jela K. Moore as Zola
 Scott Foley as Henry Burton
 Loretta Devine as Adele Webber
 Daniel Sunjata as Nurse Eli
 Debbie Allen as Catherine Avery
 Janora McDuffie as Social Worker Janet
 Holley Fain as Dr. Julia Canner
 Amanda Fuller as Intern Morgan Peterson
 Summer Glau as Nurse Emily Kovach
 Nicole Cummins as Paramedic Nicole

Notable guests 
 Kate Walsh as Dr. Addison Montgomery
 Caterina Scorsone as Dr. Amelia Shepherd
 Debra Monk as Louise O'Malley
 Kate Burton as Ellis Grey
 Robert Baker as Dr. Charles Percy
 Alfre Woodard as Justine Campbell
 Stella Maeve as Lilly
 William Daniels as Dr. Craig Thomas
 Nia Vardalos as Karen 
 Vanessa Marano as Holly Wheeler
 Mitch Pileggi as Lawrence Jennings 
 Lee Majors as Chuck Cain
 Jordan Belfi as Nick
 Cynthia Watros as Ms. Konner
 Mark Saul as Dr. Steve Mostow
 James LeGros as Pilot Jerry
 Holland Roden as Gretchen Shaw 
 Rebecca Hazlewood as Dr. Mara Keaton

Reception

Ratings

Live +SD ratings

Live + 7 Day (DVR) ratings

Critical response 
[[File:Ellen Pompeo LF.JPG|thumb|130px|Poptimal'''‍s Tanya Lane stated that Ellen Pompeo gave one of her best performances in the season finale.]]
The season received mixed-to-positive reviews. Tanner Stransky of Cinema Blend gave a fresh review to the season, "Juxtaposed against that nightmare that launched season 8's 2-hour season premiere was exactly what the show does portray rather accurately (most of the time) - the relationship drama."

Verne Gay of Newsday acknowledged the following for the show stating, "Grey's has had a good season and has an intensely loyal fan base to prove it." TV Fanatic reviewing the episode Free Falling wrote, "This episode set the season in motion, and from the looks of it, it's going to be good."

Carrie Raisler of The A.V. Club gave a negative review to the season's alternate-reality episode, "Just because a show is meant to be fun doesn't mean it shouldn't have standards, and this episode just simply didn't measure up."

Poptimal'‍s Tanya Lane regarding the season finale wrote, "Wow…just wow. Grey's Anatomy has once again managed to shock with its season finale." While she appreciated the "realism and authenticity that Grey's'' is known for", she found the episode was "almost too much" as it was "extremely gory and difficult to watch, initially because of the grisly wounds" but later because of the "heavy and emotional things that transpired". She added that "Ellen Pompeo gave one of her best performances when her character learned that her sister was dead."

DVD release

References

2011 American television seasons
2012 American television seasons
Grey's Anatomy seasons